Malo Črnelo is a small village in the Municipality of Ivančna Gorica in central Slovenia. It lies between Ivančna Gorica and Muljava in the historical region of Lower Carniola. The municipality is now included in the Central Slovenia Statistical Region. 

The local church is dedicated to Saint Margaret and belongs to the Parish of Ivančna Gorica. It was originally a Romanesque building that was extensively rebuilt in the 15th and 18th centuries.

References

External links

Malo Črnelo on Geopedia

Populated places in the Municipality of Ivančna Gorica